Sandra Edibel Guevara Pérez is a Salvadoran politician. She serves as El Salvador's Minister of Labor and Social Welfare.

References

Living people
Government ministers of El Salvador
Year of birth missing (living people)